Tendo Sisters is a Ugandan drama television series about four orphaned sisters who are left with only a piece of land as their inheritance and the rifts that grow between them as they start a new life without their parents. The series was written, produced and directed by Mariam Ndagire and stars Ndagire, Farida Nabagereka, Sarah Naava, Jamila Mulindwa as the four sisters Kisaakye, Mukisa, Sanyu and Malaika respectively and Annet Nandujja who plays their auntie, Nattendo.

The series premiered on NTV Uganda in December 2009 and ran for three seasons until 2012. The series was then picked up by Bukedde TV1 in 2012 and ran until 2014. Repeats of the series continued being aired until 2017.

Cast
Mariam Ndagire - Kisaakye 
Faridah Nabagereka  - Mukisa 
Sarah Naava  - Sanyu 
Jamila Mulindwa  - Malaika
Annet Nandujja - Nattendo

Awards and nominations

Theatre Adaptation
In 2013, a theatre play adaptation of the series was staged at Bat Valley Theater in Kampala due to the popularity of the show among theatre goers. The second season titled Chapter 2 was staged in 2014.

References

External links

2009 television series debuts
2014 television series endings
Ugandan drama television series
NTV Uganda original programming